Chinguacousy Township  is a former municipality and present-day geographic township in the Regional Municipality of Peel, Ontario, Canada.  In 1973, when Peel County became the Regional Municipality of Peel, the township was split in half, with the northern half becoming part of the town of Caledon, and the southern half, along with the township of Toronto Gore, joining the city of Brampton.

Chinguacousy Township spanned from what now is Winston Churchill Boulevard to Airport Road, Olde Base Line Road to Steeles Avenue.

Several villages were once located within Chinguacousy Township.  In most cases only small remnants like churches and cemeteries of many of these former villages exist.  Cheltenham is the largest preserved village, while Terra Cotta and Huttonville both have some historic buildings.

Bramalea, Canada's first satellite city (now a part of Brampton), was formed in Chinguacousy Township on what was once farmland.

The Chinguacousy name lives on in present-day Brampton, including Chinguacousy Park, Chinguacousy Road, the Chinguacousy Concert Band, and Chinguacousy Secondary School (many places that were originally formed as a part of the Bramalea community).

The township was named in honour of an Anishinaabe chief, Shingwauk (meaning: "Little White Pine").

People from Chinguacousy
 Nathaniel Currie

See also
List of townships in Ontario

References

History of Brampton
Former municipalities in Ontario
Caledon, Ontario
Geographic townships in Ontario
Former townships in Ontario
1973 disestablishments in Ontario
Populated places disestablished in 1973